Stephen S. Aichele (born July 2, 1948  in Philadelphia) is an American lawyer and was a member of the cabinet of former Pennsylvania governor Tom Corbett.

He became General Counsel of Pennsylvania on January 18, 2011. He held that post until he became Corbett's Chief of Staff on May 29, 2012 following the resignation of William Ward.

His wife Carol was also a member of Corbett's cabinet, serving as Secretary of the Commonwealth of Pennsylvania.

References 

Living people
1948 births
Temple University Beasley School of Law alumni
Cornell University alumni
Lawyers from Philadelphia
Pennsylvania Office of General Counsel
Chiefs of staff to United States state governors